The Caxton Building is a historic building completed in 1903 in Cleveland, Ohio. It was designed by Frank Seymour Barnum's F. S. Barnum & Co architectural firm. The 8-story steel-frame office building was constructed for the Caxton Building Company and its president Ambrose Swasey. It housed graphic arts and printing businesses, and was named after William Caxton, a British printer in the 15th century. 

The main entrance to the building is a Romanesque architecture style terra cotta archway. It includes intricate organic cartouches in the style popularized by American architect Louis Sullivan, as well as column capitals accenting its buff-colored masonry. Its ground floor retail frontage has included restaurants and cafes.

History 
The building was designed to accommodate heavy printing presses. In 1905 it housed Alfred Cahen's business which became the World Publishing Company.

The Caxton Building was added to the National Register of Historic Places in October, 1973. It was declared a Cleveland landmark in 1976. The building underwent restorations in the 1990s.

See also
World Publishing Company

References

Buildings and structures in Cleveland
Commercial buildings on the National Register of Historic Places in Ohio
Office buildings completed in 1903
Chicago school architecture in Ohio
National Register of Historic Places in Cleveland, Ohio